The Nelson House, also known as the Reynolds House, is a historic house located in Latham, Alabama. It is listed on the National Register of Historic Places.  Its 1988 NRHP nomination asserted it is locally significant as the "purest example" of the Creole Cottage style of architecture in Baldwin County.

Description and history 
Built in 1912, the Nelson House is a one-story frame, four bay house resting on a brick wall foundation. There are two interior chimneys on its gabled roof, one on the front slope and one on the rear slope, each with back-to-back fireplaces. A recessed front porch covers the full facade. The expansive gable ends are a clue to the original builder providing room for a half story which was never added.

It was added to the National Register of Historic Places on December 20, 1988.

See also
National Register of Historic Places listings in Baldwin County, Alabama

References

Houses on the National Register of Historic Places in Alabama
Houses completed in 1912
Creole cottage architecture in Alabama
National Register of Historic Places in Alabama
Residential buildings completed in 1912
Baldwin County, Alabama